The following is a list of notable events and releases of the year 2015 in Finnish music.

Events

January

February
 7 - The Uuden Musiikin Kilpailu 2015 Semi-finals was initiated February 7. The next two semi-finals is executed February 14 and 21.
 28 - The Uuden Musiikin Kilpailu 2015 Final was executed on February 28.

March

April

May

June

July

August

September

October
 29 - The Tampere Jazz Happening opened (October 29 - November 1).

November

December

Album and Singles releases

January

February

March

April

May

June

July

August

September

October

November

December

Deaths
November
 23 – Jouni Kaipainen (58), Finnish composer.

See also
Music of Finland
Finland in the Eurovision Song Contest 2015

References

 
Finnish music
Finnish